Egreš is a village and municipality in the Trebišov District in the Košice Region of eastern Slovakia.

History
In historical records, the village was first mentioned in 1272 AD.

Geography
The village lies at an altitude of 153 metres and covers an area of 5.603 km².
It has a population of about 438 people.

Ethnicity
The village is about 75% Slovak, 24% Roma in ethnicity, and 1% Czech and Ukrainian in ethnicity.

Facilities
The village has a public library and a football pitch.

Genealogical resources
The records for genealogical research are available at the state archive "Statny Archiv in Kosice, Slovakia"
 Roman Catholic church records (births/marriages/deaths): 1723-1896 (parish B)
 Reformated church records (births/marriages/deaths): 1756-1952 (parish B)

See also
 List of municipalities and towns in Slovakia

External links
Wayback Machine
Surnames of living people in Egres

Villages and municipalities in Trebišov District